Aegiphila rimbachii is a species of tree in the family Lamiaceae. It is endemic to Bolívar Province in Ecuador, where it grows in the cloud forests of the Andes.

References

rimbachii
Endemic flora of Ecuador
Vulnerable plants
Taxonomy articles created by Polbot